Cecil "Butch" Dale Bauer (20 February 1927 – 6 August 2004) was an owner of an insurance company, former mayor of the city of Loveland, Ohio and served on city council of the city for several years.

Early life
Cecil grew up with eight brothers and sisters in Loveland with his parents. His family was very poor while he was growing up, partly a result of the Great Depression. He graduated from Loveland High School and married his wife, Dolores, soon after. Cecil had three children, Cecilia Sue, Bradford Dale, and Melody Gayle. He had six grandchildren. His wife died of cancer in July 2000. He and Dolores were married for 52 years.

Career
He was drafted into World War II and served in Germany for a time. Bauer founded his own insurance company, Bauer Insurance and continued to work there for the rest of his career. There were offices in Loveland and Mason. His son had been running the company for some time before that. Brad Bauer eventually merged with another insurance company, Brower Insurance. In the building that Bauer Insurance formerly occupied, the Loveland Chamber of commerce now resides.

Death
Cecil was diagnosed with lung cancer in early August 2004 after displaying some symptoms in late July. He died on 6 August 2004.

He was buried next to his wife at a cemetery in Maineville, Ohio. Visitation was held on 11 August 2004 at Tufts-Schildmeyer funeral home in Loveland and the funeral was held the next day at Epiphany United Methodist Church, where Cecil was a member. In December 2003 Cecil was awarded, along with two other former mayors of Loveland, with a landmark at a local park.

References

1927 births
2004 deaths
Mayors of places in Ohio
People from Loveland, Ohio
20th-century American politicians